"Beautiful Girl" a song by Australian rock band INXS, released as the fifth international single from their eighth album, Welcome to Wherever You Are (1992), on 1 February 1993. The song was written by Andrew Farriss, who was inspired to write it by the birth of his baby daughter. In an interview by Debbie Kruger, the INXS keyboardist explained: "I was writing lyrics like 'Baby Don't Cry' and 'Beautiful Girl' and lyrics just about how wonderful it is to have something else in your life besides yourself to worry about and think about."

The song was used for an American TV awareness campaign about the effects of anorexia.

Reception
Q said Hutchence sounded, "a lot like Velvets-era Lou Reed on "Beautiful Girl", a delicate melody which the old-style INXS would have beaten to a pulp."

B-sides
The B-sides on the first of two UK CD Single releases include solo compositions from lead guitarist Tim Farriss: "In My Living Room" and another by saxophonist and guitarist Kirk Pengilly entitled "Ashtar Speaks" as well the original version of "Strange Desire" from the Welcome to Wherever You Are album. The second CD release contained a remixed version of "Beautiful Girl", as well as a new remix of "Underneath the Colours" from the Underneath the Colours album and an instrumental version of "Wishing Well", also from the Welcome to Wherever You Are album.

Track listings
CD5 maxi single INXSCD24 Mercury/UK
 Beautiful Girl (3:31)
 Strange Desire (Original Recording) (4:40)
 In My Living Room (3:56)
 Ptar Speaks (3:39)

CD maxi single INXCX24 Mercury/UK
 Beautiful Girl (Mendelsohn Mix) (3.11)
 Strange Desire (Original Recording) (4:40)
 Underneath The Colours (Chicken Mix) (4.08)
 Wishing Well (Instrumental) (3.26)

CD5 45099-18322 EastWest/Australia
 Beautiful Girl (3:31)
 Strange Desire (Original Recording) (4:40)
 In My Living Room (3:56)
 Ptar Speaks (3:39)
 Wishing Well (Instrumental) (3.26)

7-inch vinyl and Cassette single INXS24 Mercury/UK
 Beautiful Girl (3:31)
 Strange Desire (Original Recording) (4:40)

Cassette single 4-87383 Atlantic/US
 Beautiful Girl (3:31)
 Strange Desire (Original Recording) (4:40)

Cassette single 45099-1844-4 EastWest/Australia
 Beautiful Girl (3:31)
 Strange Desire (Original Recording) (4:40)
 In My Living Room (3:56)
 Ptar Speaks (3:39)

Charts

Weekly charts

Year-end charts

References

INXS songs
1992 songs
1993 singles
Atlantic Records singles
East West Records singles
Mercury Records singles
Music videos directed by Mark Pellington
Song recordings produced by Mark Opitz
Songs written by Andrew Farriss